Rovenki may refer to:
Rovenky (Rovenki), a city in Ukraine
Rovenki, Russia, a work settlement in Rovensky District of Belgorod Oblast, Russia